Venada is a genus of skippers in the family Hesperiidae.

Species 
Venada consists of the following species:
Venada advena
Venada cacao
Venada daneva
Venada lamella Burns in Burns, Janzen, Hallwachs & Hajibabaei, 2013
Verdana neranja
Verdana nevada

References
Natural History Museum Lepidoptera genus database

Hesperiidae
Hesperiidae genera